Hilde Ziegler (1939–1999) was a German film and television actress.

Selected filmography
 Assassination in Davos (1975)
 The Swissmakers (1978)
 Kassettenliebe (1982)
 L'amour des femmes (1982)
  (1994)
 Beresina, or the Last Days of Switzerland (1999)

References

Further reading

External links

1939 births
1999 deaths
People from Lörrach
German film actresses
German television actresses
20th-century German actresses